is a station on the Tokyo Monorail in Ōta, Tokyo, Japan, serving Haneda Airport.

Lines

Station layout
The station is an underground station with one island platform, fitted with waist-high platform screen doors. It is located below the Terminal 1 Building of Haneda Airport.

Platforms

Adjacent stations

History
It was renamed Haneda Airport Terminal 1 Station on 1 December 2004 after  the opening of Haneda Airport Terminal 2 Station, with its Japanese name written as 羽田空港第1ビル駅. From 14 March 2020, it was renamed as 羽田空港第1ターミナル駅 but retains the same English name.

Passenger statistics
In fiscal 2011, the station was used by an average of 27,005 passengers daily.

Surrounding area
 Haneda Airport Terminal 1·2 Station (Keikyu Airport Line)

References

External links 
 Tokyo Monorail Haneda Airport Terminal 1 Station 
 Tokyo International Airport 

Tokyo Monorail Haneda Line
Stations of Tokyo Monorail
Railway stations in Tokyo
Railway stations in Japan opened in 1993
Airport railway stations in Japan
Haneda Airport
Ōta, Tokyo